NFL Xtreme 2 is a video game developed and published by 989 Studios for the PlayStation in 1999. The cover athlete is Pro Football Hall of Fame defensive tackle John Randle.

Reception

The game received mixed reviews, albeit a bit more well-received than the first NFL Xtreme, according to the review aggregation website GameRankings. John Lee of NextGen said, "Football purists will not be amused. Blitz fans will not be amused. In fact, unless you're looking for a simple diversion and [you] don't mind an erratic playbook, neither will you." The Rookie of GamePro, however, called it "a topnotch arcade-style football game with enough features, trash-talk, and insane action to get your blood pumping."

Notes

References

External links
 

1999 video games
National Football League video games
North America-exclusive video games
PlayStation (console) games
PlayStation (console)-only games
Video games developed in the United States